= Fondation Barbier-Mueller pour l'étude de la poésie italienne de la Renaissance =

Swiss organization

The Fondation Barbier-Mueller pour l'étude de la poésie italienne de la Renaissance, or "Barbier-Mueller foundation for the study of Italian Renaissance poetry", is a Swiss foundation. It forms part of the faculty of Letters of the University of Geneva. It was created in 1997 when the Swiss collector Jean Paul Barbier-Mueller, author of Ma Bibliothèque poétique, donated his collection of early and rare editions of Italian Renaissance poetry to the university. The collection currently consists of approximately 550 volumes, which are housed in the Bibliothèque d’Italien, the Italian section of the library of the faculty.

The foundation publishes the journal Italique. Specialised texts and scholarly editions of Italian poetry are issued in the seriesTextes et Travaux de la Fondation Barbier-Mueller.
